The Waquoit Historic District encompasses the historic village center of Waquoit, a village of Falmouth, Massachusetts.  Waquoit Village is located in southeastern Falmouth at the head of Waquoit Bay.  The district extends along the Waquoit Highway (Massachusetts Route 28) between Childs River Road and Red Brook Road, excluding the section between Parsons Lane and Carriage Shop Road.  The latter two roads run through the village center, and the district includes many properties lining those roads as well.  The  district includes 81 predominantly residential properties; it was listed on the National Register of Historic Places in 2004.

See also
National Register of Historic Places listings in Barnstable County, Massachusetts

References

Historic districts in Barnstable County, Massachusetts
National Register of Historic Places in Barnstable County, Massachusetts
Falmouth, Massachusetts
Historic districts on the National Register of Historic Places in Massachusetts